Millcreek Township or Mill Creek Township may refer to:

Arkansas
 Mill Creek Township, Ashley County, Arkansas, in Ashley County, Arkansas
 Mill Creek Township, Franklin County, Arkansas, in Franklin County, Arkansas
 Mill Creek Township, Izard County, Arkansas, in Izard County, Arkansas
 Mill Creek Township, Lincoln County, Arkansas, in Lincoln County, Arkansas
 Mill Creek Township, Madison County, Arkansas
 Mill Creek Township, Polk County, Arkansas, in Polk County, Arkansas
 Mill Creek Township, Scott County, Arkansas, in Scott County, Arkansas
 Mill Creek Township, Sevier County, Arkansas, in Sevier County, Arkansas

Indiana
 Millcreek Township, Fountain County, Indiana

Kansas
 Mill Creek Township, Bourbon County, Kansas
 Mill Creek Township, Pottawatomie County, Kansas, in Pottawatomie County, Kansas
 Mill Creek Township, Wabaunsee County, Kansas, in Wabaunsee County, Kansas
 Mill Creek Township, Washington County, Kansas, in Washington County, Kansas

Missouri
 Mill Creek Township, Morgan County, Missouri

Ohio
 Mill Creek Township, Coshocton County, Ohio
 Mill Creek Township, Hamilton County, Ohio
 Mill Creek Township, Union County, Ohio
 Mill Creek Township, Williams County, Ohio

Pennsylvania
 Mill Creek Township, Lycoming County, Pennsylvania
 Mill Creek Township, Mercer County, Pennsylvania
 Millcreek Township, Clarion County, Pennsylvania
 Millcreek Township, Erie County, Pennsylvania
 Millcreek Township, Lebanon County, Pennsylvania

Utah
 Millcreek Township, Utah

Township name disambiguation pages